The 1925 Oregon Webfoots football team was an American football team that represented the University of Oregon in the Pacific Coast Conference (PCC) during the 1925 PCC football season.  In its second, non-consecutive season under head coach Richard Shore Smith, Oregon compiled a 1–5–1 record (0–5 against PCC opponents), finished in last place in the PCC, and was outscored by a total of 108 to 53. The team played its home games at Hayward Field in Eugene, Oregon.

Schedule

References

Oregon
Oregon Ducks football seasons
Oregon Webfoots football